The U.S. state of West Virginia was formed out of western Virginia and added to the Union as a direct result of the American Civil War (see History of West Virginia), in which it became the only modern state to have declared its independence from the Confederacy. In the summer of 1861, Union troops, which included a number of newly formed Western Virginia regiments, under General George McClellan, drove off Confederate troops under General Robert E. Lee. This essentially freed Unionists in the northwestern counties of Virginia to form a functioning government of their own as a result of the Wheeling Convention. Prior to the admission of West Virginia the government in Wheeling formally claimed jurisdiction over all of Virginia, although from its creation it was firmly committed to the formation of a separate state.

After Lee's departure, western Virginia continued to be a target of Confederate raids. Both the Confederate and state governments in Richmond refused to recognize the creation of the new state in 1863, and thus for the duration of the war the Confederacy regarded its own military offensives within West Virginia not as invasion but rather as an effort to liberate what it considered to be enemy-occupied territory administered by an illegitimate government in Wheeling. Nevertheless, due to its increasingly precarious military position and desperate shortage of resources, Confederate military actions in what it continued to regard as "western Virginia" focused less on reconquest as opposed to both on supplying the Confederate Army with provisions as well as attacking the vital Baltimore and Ohio Railroad that linked the northeast with the Midwest, as exemplified in the Jones-Imboden Raid. Guerrilla warfare also gripped the new state, especially in the Allegheny Mountain counties to the east, where loyalties were much more divided than in the solidly Unionist northwest part of the state. Despite this, the Confederacy was never able to seriously threaten the Unionists' overall control of West Virginia.

History

Political events
On April 17, 1861, the Virginia state convention in Richmond declared secession. There were 49 delegates representing the 50 counties that became West Virginia. On April 17 they voted 32 against the ordinance, 13, in favor, and 4 absent or abstained. The convention adjourned on May 1, to be reconvened in June. Most of the 49 delegates returned to Richmond in June and a majority signed the ordinance of secession. Of the 49 delegates 29 signed the ordinance.

On May 15, western Virginia Unionists convened the first session of the Wheeling Convention. Many of the delegates were informally or self-appointed, so the Convention only denounced secession and called for a formal election of delegates. The elected delegates met in the second session on 11 June. On 20 June the Convention declared that by acceding to secession, the officials of the state government in Richmond had forfeited their offices, which were now vacant. The Convention then elected replacements for these state offices, creating the Restored Government of Virginia.

The "Restored" government was generally supported in areas where secession was opposed. Union troops also held the three northernmost counties in the Shenandoah Valley, and despite the pro-secession views of most residents, these counties were also administered by the "Restored" government.

At the Wheeling Convention, some delegates proposed the immediate establishment of a separate state. However, other delegates pointed out that the creation of a new state would require the consent of Virginia, under Article IV of the Constitution. Thus it was necessary to establish the Restored Government of Virginia to give that consent, which was granted 20 August 1861.

A referendum in October 1861 approved statehood; a constitutional convention met, and its work was approved by referendum in April 1862. Congress approved statehood that December, with the condition that slavery must gradually be abolished in the new state. This condition required a new constitutional convention and referendum, which was approved.

On 20 June 1863, the newly proclaimed state of West Virginia was admitted to the Union, including all the western counties and the lower (northern) Shenandoah "panhandle".

All the northern states had free public school systems before the war, but not the border states. West Virginia set up its system in 1863. Over bitter opposition it established an almost-equal education for black children, most of whom were ex-slaves.

When Union troops occupied parts of eastern Virginia such as Alexandria and Norfolk, these areas came under the nominal control of the Restored Government. They were not included in West Virginia. With West Virginia statehood, the Restored government relocated to Alexandria.

The pro-Confederate state government in Richmond maintained its claim to the Commonwealth's antebellum borders and, under the auspices of the state's 1851 constitution, administered the regions of the Commonwealth still held under Confederate arms - at the time of West Virginia's statehood this included meaningful levels of control in about thirteen counties claimed by the newly admitted state. Many localities (especially in the southeastern part of the state) sent representatives to both the Wheeling and Richmond state legislatures.

As was the case with all regions the Confederacy claimed but did not control, the Confederate States Congress seated Representatives from districts encompassing the whole of Virginia's antebellum borders until its dissolution. In House districts where the Confederates could not hold conventional elections, the Confederate Congress accepted the fragmentary Congressional results from army and refugee camps as representative of the majority of residents. While Confederate Congressional elections were ostensibly nonpartisan, especially in Virginia districts under Union occupation the administration of President Jefferson Davis manipulated the electoral process to ensure the election of pro-administration representatives, in large part to counteract the increasing tendency of House districts still under Confederate control to elect anti-administration candidates.

While the level of effective Confederate control over West Virginia would continue to diminish as the war progressed, authorities in Richmond were able to maintain at least a tenuous control over West Virginia's southeastern border regions until the end of the war.

Slavery

During the Civil War, a Unionist government in Wheeling, Virginia, presented a statehood bill to Congress in order to create a new state from 48 counties in western Virginia. The new state would eventually incorporate 50 counties. The issue of slavery in the new state delayed approval of the bill. In the Senate Charles Sumner objected to the admission of a new slave state, while Benjamin Wade defended statehood as long as a gradual emancipation clause would be included in the new state constitution. Two senators represented the Unionist Virginia government, John S. Carlile and Waitman T. Willey. Senator Carlile objected that Congress had no right to impose emancipation on West Virginia, while Willey proposed a compromise amendment to the state constitution for gradual abolition. Sumner attempted to add his own amendment to the bill, which was defeated, and the statehood bill passed both houses of Congress with the addition of what became known as the Willey Amendment. President Lincoln signed the bill on December 31, 1862. Voters in western Virginia approved the Willey Amendment on March 26, 1863.

President Lincoln had issued the Emancipation Proclamation on January 1, 1863, which exempted from emancipation the border states (four slave states loyal to the Union) as well as some territories occupied by Union forces within Confederate states. Two additional counties were added to West Virginia in late 1863, Berkeley and Jefferson. The slaves in Berkeley were also under exemption but not those in Jefferson County. As of the census of 1860, the 49 exempted counties held some 6000 slaves over 21 years of age who would not have been emancipated, about 40% of the total slave population. The terms of the Willey Amendment only freed children, at birth or as they came of age, and prohibited the importation of slaves.

West Virginia became the 35th state on June 20, 1863, and the last slave state admitted to the Union. Eighteen months later, the West Virginia legislature completely abolished slavery, and also ratified the 13th Amendment on February 3, 1865.

Military events
In April 1861, Virginia troops under Thomas J. "Stonewall" Jackson occupied Harpers Ferry and part of the Baltimore and Ohio Railroad leading into western Virginia. They seized many B&O locomotives and railcars on May 23.

In May and June 1861, Confederate forces advanced into western Virginia to impose control by the Richmond government and the Confederacy. They got no further than Philippi, due to bad roads. Then Union troops under McClellan drove them back in July.

There was additional campaigning further south, where Greenbrier County was pro-Confederate, enabling Confederate troops to enter Nicholas County to the west. In September 1861, Union troops drove the Confederates out of Nicholas County and defeated their counterattack at Cheat Mountain.

Thereafter all of the trans-Allegheny region was under firm Union control except for the southern and eastern counties. Greenbrier County was occupied in May 1862. Pro-Confederate guerrillas burned and plundered in some sections, and were not entirely suppressed until after the war was ended.

There were two minor Confederate expeditions against the northeastern corner of the west later on: Jackson's Romney Expedition in January 1862; and the Jones-Imboden Raid in May–June 1863.

Union strategy for the region was to protect the vital B&O Railroad and also attack eastward into the Shenandoah Valley and southwestern Virginia. This latter goal proved impossible, due to the poor roads across mountainous terrain.

The B&O passed across the lower (northern) end of the Shenandoah, east of the Alleghenies. This area was therefore occupied by Union troops for nearly all of the war, and was a scene of frequent combat.

Harpers Ferry was the site of a major U.S. Army arsenal, and was taken by Confederates in the opening days of the war, and again during the Maryland Campaign of 1862. During the Maryland Campaign it was a route of invasion and retreat for the Army of Northern Virginia; the campaign concluded there with the Battle of Shepherdstown.

Many soldiers from West Virginia served on both sides in the war.

Those in Confederate service were in "Virginia" regiments.

Those in Union service were also in "Virginia" regiments until statehood, when several Unionist "Virginia" regiments were redesignated "West Virginia" regiments. Among these were the 7th West Virginia Infantry, famed for actions at Antietam and Gettysburg, and the 3rd West Virginia Cavalry, which also fought at Gettysburg.

On the Confederate side, Albert G. Jenkins, a former U.S. Representative, recruited a brigade of cavalry in western Virginia, which he led until his death in May 1864. Other western Virginians served under Brig. Gen. John Imboden and in the Stonewall Brigade under Brig. Gen. James A. Walker.

Guerrilla warfare
On May 28, 1861, one of the first trials of the Civil War for sabotage took place in Parkersburg, Virginia. A group of men were found playing cards under a B&O railroad bridge and arrested by Federal authorities. The trial was conducted by Judge William Lowther Jackson (later, Gen. W.L. Jackson, C.S.A.). The men were acquitted, since no actual crime had taken place, but Parkersburg was split over the verdict, and Judge Jackson left to join Col. Porterfield at Philippi.

With the defeat of Confederate forces at the Battle of Philippi and the Battle of Cheat Mountain only occasionally would they occupy parts of western Virginia. Local supporters of Richmond were left to their own devices. Many guerrilla units originated in the pre-war militia, and these were designated Virginia State Rangers and starting in June, 1862, these were incorporated into Virginia State Line regiments. By March, 1863, however, many were enlisted in the regular Confederate army.

There were others though who operated without sanction of the Richmond government, some fighting on behalf of the Confederacy, while others were nothing more than bandits who preyed on Union and Confederate alike. Early in the war captured guerrillas were sent to Camp Chase or Johnson Island in Ohio, Fort Delaware in Delaware and also the Atheneum in Wheeling. Some were paroled after taking an oath, but many returned to their guerrilla activities. The Union authorities began to organize their own guerrilla bands, the most famous of which was the "Snake Hunters", headed by Capt. Baggs. They patrolled Wirt and Calhoun counties through the winter of 1861–62 and captured scores of Moccasin Rangers, which they sent as prisoners to Wheeling.

The fight against the rebel guerrillas took a new turn under Gen. John C. Fremont and Col. George Crook, who had spent his pre-war career as an "Indian fighter" in the Pacific Northwest. Col. Crook took command of the 36th Ohio Infantry, centered around Summersville, Nicholas County. He trained them in guerrilla tactics and adopted a "no prisoners" policy.

On January 1, 1862, Crook led his men on an expedition north to Sutton, Braxton County, where he believed Confederate forces were located. None were found, but his troops encountered heavy guerrilla resistance and responded by burning houses and towns along the line of march. But by August, 1862, Unionist efforts were severely hampered with the withdrawal of troops to eastern Virginia.

In this vacuum Gen. William W. Loring, C.S.A, recaptured the Kanawha valley, Gen. Albert Gallatin Jenkins, C.S.A., moved his forces through central West Virginia, capturing many supplies and prisoners. Confederate recruitment increased, Gen. Loring opening recruitment offices as far north as Ripley.

In response to rebel raids, Gen. Robert H. Milroy issued a command demanding reparations to be paid in cash and proceeded to assess fines against Tucker county citizens, guilty or not, and threatened them with the gallows or house-burning. Jefferson Davis and Confederate authorities lodged formal complaints with Gen. Henry Wager Halleck in Washington, who censured Gen. Milroy. However, Milroy argued in defense of his policy and was allowed to proceed.

By early 1863 Union efforts in West Virginia were going badly. Unionists were losing confidence in the Wheeling government to protect them, and with the approaching dismemberment of Virginia into two states guerrilla activity increased in an effort to prevent organization of county governments. By 1864 some stability had been achieved in some central counties, but guerrilla activity was never effectively countered. Union forces that were needed elsewhere were tied down in what many soldiers considered a backwater of the war. But Federal forces could not afford to ignore any rebel territory, particularly one so close to the Ohio River.

As late as January, 1865, Gov. Arthur I. Boreman complained of large scale guerrilla activity as far north as Harrison and Marion counties. The Wheeling government was unable to control more than 20 to 25 counties in the new state. In one last, brazen act of the guerrilla war, McNeill's Rangers of Hardy County kidnapped Generals George Crook and Benjamin F. Kelley from behind Union lines and delivered them as prisoners of war to Richmond. The Confederate surrender at Appomattox finally brought an end to guerrilla war in West Virginia.

Soldiery
On May 30, 1861, Brig. Gen. George B. McClellan in Cincinnati wrote to President Lincoln: "I am confidently assured that very considerable numbers of volunteers can be raised in Western Virginia...". After nearly two months in the field in West Virginia he was less optimistic. He wrote to Gov. Francis Harrison Pierpont of the Restored Government of Virginia in Wheeling that he and his army were anxious to assist the new government, but that eventually they would be needed elsewhere, and that he urged that troops be raised "among the population". "Before I left Grafton I made requisitions for arms clothing etc for 10,000 Virginia troops – I fear that my estimate was much too large." On August 3, 1861, the Wellsburg "Herald" editorialized "A pretty condition Northwestern Virginia is in to establish herself as a separate state...after all the drumming and all the gas about a separate state she has actually organized in the field four not entire regiments of soldiers and one of these hails almost entirely from the Panhandle."

Similar difficulties were experienced by Confederate authorities at the beginning of the war. On May 14, 1861, Col. George A. Porterfield arrived in Grafton to secure volunteers, and reported slow enlistment. Col. Porterfield's difficulty ultimately, however, was lack of support by the Richmond government, which did not send enough guns, tents and other supplies. He eventually turned away hundreds of volunteers due to lack of equipment. Gen. Henry A. Wise also complained of recruitment in the Kanawha valley, though he eventually assembled 2,500 infantry, 700 cavalry, three battalions of artillery for a total of 4,000 men which became known as "Wise's Legion". One regiment from the Wise legion, the 3rd Infantry (later reorganized as the 60th Virginia Infantry) was sent to South Carolina in 1862, and it was from Maj. Thomas Broun of the 3rd Infantry that Gen. Robert E. Lee bought his famous horse Traveller.

In April 1862 the Confederate government instituted a military draft, and nearly a year later the U.S. government did the same. The Confederate draft was not generally effective in West Virginia due to the breakdown of Virginia state government in the western counties and Union occupation of the northern counties, although conscription did occur in the southern counties. In the southern and eastern counties of West Virginia Confederate recruitment continued at least until the beginning of 1865.

The Wheeling government asked for an exemption to the Federal draft, saying that they had exceeded their quota under previous calls. An exemption was granted for 1864, but in 1865 a new demand was made for troops, which Gov. Boreman struggled to fill. In some counties, ex-Confederates suddenly found themselves enrolled in the U.S. Army.

The loyalty of some Federal troops had been questioned early in the war. The rapid conquest of northern West Virginia had caught a number of Southern sympathizers behind Union lines. A series of letters to Gen. Samuels and Gov. Pierpoint in the Dept. of Archives and History in Charleston, most dated 1862, reveal the concern of Union officers. Col. Harris, 10th Company, March 27, 1862, to Gov. Pierpoint: "The election of officers in the Gilmer County Company was a farce. The men elected were rebels and bushwhackers. The election of these men was intended, no doubt, as a burlesque on the reorganization of the militia."

Because the government in Richmond did not keep separate military records for what would become West Virginia, there has never been an official count of Confederate service in West Virginia. Early estimates were very low, in 1901 historians Fast & Maxwell placed the figure at about 7,000. An exception to the low estimates is found in Why The Solid South?, whose authors believed the Confederate numbers exceeded Union numbers. In subsequent histories the estimates rose, Otis K. Rice placed the number at 10,000-12,000. Richard O. Curry in 1964 placed the figure at 15,000. The first detailed study of Confederate soldiery estimates the number at 18,000, which is close to the 18,642 figure stated by the Confederate Dept. of Western Virginia in 1864. In 1989 a study by James Carter Linger estimated the number at nearly 22,000.

The official number of Union soldiers from West Virginia is 31,884 as stated by the Provost Marshal General of the United States. These numbers include, however, re-enlistment figures as well as out-of-state soldiers who enlisted in West Virginia regiments. In 1905 Charles H. Ambler estimated the number of native Union soldiers to be about 20,000.

Richard Current estimated native Union numbers at 29,000. In his calculations, however, he only allowed for a deduction of 2,000 out-of-state soldiers in West Virginia regiments. Ohio contributed nearly 5,000, with about 2,000 from Pennsylvania and other states.

In 1995 the George Tyler Moore Center for the Study of the Civil War began a soldier-by-soldier count of all regiments that would include West Virginians, both Union and Confederate. They concluded that West Virginia contributed approximately 20,000-22,000 men each to both the Union and Confederate governments.

Nursing during the Civil War

The Sisters of St. Joseph, who operated Wheeling Hospital in that city, were nurses during the war. They treated soldiers brought to the hospital and prisoners at the Athenaeum in downtown Wheeling. In 1864, the Union army took control of the hospital, and the sisters went on the federal payroll as matrons and nurses, beginning that summer. Several of them later received pensions in recognition of their service.

Civil War battles in West Virginia

The Manassas Campaign:
 Battle of Hoke's Run (July 2, 1861), Berkeley County – Stonewall Jackson successfully delays a larger Union force.

The Western Virginia Campaign:
 Battle of Philippi (June 3, 1861), Barbour County – Union victory propels George McClellan into the limelight.
 Battle of Laurel Hill (July 7–11, 1861), Barbour County – Morris routs Confederate troops in 5 days of skirmishing at Belington in a diversionary attack as the opening portion of the Battle of Rich Mountain.
 Battle of Rich Mountain (July 11, 1861), Randolph County – Another McClellan victory propels him to high command.
 Battle of Corrick's Ford (July 13, 1861), Tucker County – Confederate Brig. Gen. Robert S. Garnett is the first general officer killed in the war.
 Battle of Kessler's Cross Lanes (August 26, 1861), Nicholas County – Confederates rout Tyler's Union force; Lee arrives soon after.
 Battle of Carnifex Ferry (September 10, 1861), Nicholas County – Rosecrans drives back the Confederates and wins more territory.
 Battle of Cheat Mountain (September 12–15, 1861), Pocahontas County – Lee is beaten and is recalled to Richmond.
 Battle of Greenbrier River (October 3, 1861), Pocahontas County – Inconclusive fight brings only bloodshed, but no resolution.
 Battle of Barboursville, (WV) (July 13,1861) Cabell County, West Virginia - 5 Companies of the 2nd Kentucky Infantry routes The Border Rangers and local militia atop “Fortification Hill” (Now occupied by Veterans Affairs)
 Battle of Scary Creek (July 17, 1861), Putnam County, West Virginia - The Battle of Scary Creek was a minor battle fought during the American Civil War across the Kanawha River from present-day Nitro.
 Battle of Guyandotte (November 10–11, 1861), Cabell County– Confederate cavalry attacks the town and the small untrained Union force stationed there. In retaliation, much of the town is burned by the Union the next day.
 Battle of Camp Allegheny (December 13, 1861), Pocahontas County – Union attack is repulsed and both sides camp for the winter.

Later actions:
 Battle of Hancock (January 5–6, 1862), Morgan County – Stonewall Jackson's operations against the B&O Railroad.
 Battle of the Henry Clark House (May 1, 1862), Mercer County, West Virginia – Stonewall Jackson's Shenandoah Valley Campaign – Cox's actions against Princeton and the Virginia & Tennessee Railroad at Dublin, Virginia.
 Battle of Princeton Court House (May 16–18, 1862), Mercer County, West Virginia – Jackson's Shenandoah Valley Campaign – Cox's actions against the Virginia & Tennessee Railroad at Dublin, Virginia.
 Battle of Fayetteville (West Virginia) (September 10, 1862) Union Colonel Edward Siber's brigade cannot stop multiple brigades led by Confederate Major General William W. Loring as the Confederate army advances to drive Union forces out of the Kanawha River Valley.
 Battle of Harpers Ferry (September 12–15, 1862), Jefferson County – Jackson surrounds the town and forces its garrison to surrender.
 Jenkins Raid (August 22, 1862-September 13, 1862) - General Albert Jenkins Cavalry run a diversion as General William Loring takes Charleston. 
 Battle of Charleston (September 13, 1862), Kanawha County – Loring's Confederates take Charleston while Union forces retreat to Ohio.
 Battle of Shepherdstown (September 19–20, 1862), Jefferson County – A. P. Hill's counterattack secures Lee's retreat from Sharpsburg.
 Battle of Hurricane Bridge (March 28, 1863), Putnam County – Skirmish between Union & Confederate forces.
 Jones-Imboden Raid (April-May, 1863)- Confederates look to disrupt Union operations in Western Virginia. 
 Battle of White Sulphur Springs (August 26–27, 1863), Greenbrier County, West Virginia – Col. George Patton turns back Averell's raid against Lewisburg.
 Battle of Bulltown (October 13, 1863), Braxton County, West Virginia – Union garrison holds against Confederate attack.
 Battle of Droop Mountain (November 6, 1863), Pocahontas County – As a result of the Union victory, Confederate resistance in the state essentially collapsed.
 Battle of Moorefield (August 7, 1864), Hardy County – Union cavalry drives off John McCausland's Confederate cavalry and captured nearly 500 men.
 Battle of Summit Point (August 21, 1864), Jefferson County – Inconclusive action during Union Maj. Gen. Philip Sheridan's Shenandoah Valley Campaign.
 Battle of Smithfield Crossing (August 25–29, 1864), Jefferson and Berkeley counties – Inconclusive. Two of Jubal Early's infantry divisions force back a Union cavalry division and are stopped by an infantry counterattack.

West Virginians in the Civil War
Union
 Francis H. Pierpont, "Father of West Virginia" - Governor of West Virginia (reorganized government) from Monongalia County in 1861 to 1863
 Arthur I. Boreman - Governor of West Virginia from Tyler County in 1863 to 1869
 Isaac H. Duval - Brigadier General and politician from Wellsburg (Brooke County)
 Nathan Goff Jr. - Major from Clarksburg (Harrison County), became Secretary of the Navy and Governor of West Virginia
 Thomas M. Harris - Brigadier General from Harrisville (Richie County)
 Daniel D. Johnson - Colonel (infantry) and Senator from Tyler County
 Benjamin F. Kelley - Brigadier General residing at Wheeling
 George R. Latham - Colonel (infantry) and Congressman residing at Grafton (Taylor County)
 Fabricius A. Cather - Major (1st West Virginia Cavalry) from Taylor County
 Joseph A.J. Lightburn - Brigadier General from Lewis County
 Jesse L. Reno - Major General from Wheeling
 David H. Strother - Colonel (cavalry) from Martinsburg (Berkeley County)
 William B. Curtis - Colonel (12th West Virginia Infantry), later Brevet Brigadier General, from Putnam County
 Joseph Thoburn - Irish-born Colonel (infantry) from Wheeling
 John Hinebaugh - Second Lieutenant (6th West Virginia Cavalry) from Preston County
 John Witcher - Bvt. Brigadier General (cavalry) from Cabell County, became U.S. Congressman
 James F. Ellis - Corporal (15th West Virginia Infantry) from Lewis County
 Joseph Snider - Colonel (infantry) from Monongalia County
 Martin R. Delany - Major (104th regiment of the United States Colored Troops) from Jefferson County

26 Medals of Honor were credited to West Virginians for actions during the war. Another 6 medals were awarded to West Virginians who relocated and were credited to service in other state regiments.A total of 14 medals were awarded to soldiers of the 1st West Virginia Cavalry; making it one of the highest decorated regiments of the Union Army.

Confederate
 Belle Boyd - female spy who provided intelligence to the Confederate States Army
 Allen T. Caperton - one of the Confederate Senators for Virginia, later a U.S. Senator for West Virginia, from Monroe County
 Raleigh E. Colston - Brigadier General residing in Berkeley County
 Charles J. Faulkner - Lieutenant Colonel, U.S. Congressman and diplomat detained as a prisoner early in the war
 Birkett D. Fry - Brigadier General and former filibuster from Kanawha County
 John Echols Brigadier General from Monroe County, commander of the Dept. of Western Virginia who led a brigade composed of many West Virginia soldiers
 George M. Edgar - Lt. Colonel and founder of Edgar's Battalion, became president of a university that would later be named University of Arkansas and also a seminary that eventually became Florida State University
 Walter Gwynn - Brigadier General from Jefferson County
 William Lowther Jackson - Brigadier General and former Lt. Governor from Clarksburg (Harrison County)
 Thomas J. "Stonewall" Jackson - Lieutenant General from Clarksburg (Harrison County)
 Albert G. Jenkins - Brigadier General former U.S. Congressman from Cabell County who led a brigade of western Virginia cavalrymen
 John McCausland - Brigadier General residing at Point Pleasant (Mason County)
 John Hanson McNeill - Captain and partisan commander from Moorefield (Hardy County)
 Alexander W. Monroe - Colonel and politician from Hampshire County
 John Q.A. Nadenbousch - Colonel (infantry) from Berkeley County
 Edwin Gray Lee - Brigadier General from Shepherdstown (Jefferson County)
 Charles T. O'Ferrall - Colonel (cavalry) and politician from Berkeley Springs (Morgan Country), became Governor of Virginia
 George S. Patton Sr. - Lieutenant Colonel from Charleston, mortally wounded at Battle of Opequon; the grandfather and namesake of American World War II general George S. Patton Jr.
 George A. Porterfield - Colonel (infantry) from Berkeley County
 M. Jeff Thompson - Brigadier General in the Missouri State Guard from Harpers Ferry

See also
 Confederate government of West Virginia
 Confederate States of America - Animated map of state secession and state formation
 Restored government of Virginia
 Romney, West Virginia during the American Civil War
 West Virginia Civil War Union units
 West Virginia Civil War Confederate Units
 Wheeling Convention
 White Top

Notes

Bibliography
 Ambler, Charles H. Sectionalism in Virginia from 1776 to 1861 (1910)
 Curry, Richard Orr. "A Reappraisal of Statehood Politics in West Virginia", Journal of Southern History 28 (November 1962): 403–21. in JSTOR
 Curry, Richard Orr. "Crisis Politics in West Virginia, 1861–1870," in Richard O. Curry ed., Radicalism, Racism, and Party Realignment: The Border States During Reconstruction (1969)
 Curry, Richard Orr. A House Divided: A Study of Statehood Politics and Copperhead Movement in West Virginia (1964)
 Fredette, Allison. "The View from the Border: West Virginia Republicans and Women's Rights in the Age of Emancipation," West Virginia History, Spring2009, Vol. 3 Issue 1, pp 57–80, 1861–70 era
 Graham, Michael B. The Coal River Valley in the Civil War: West Virginia Mountains, 1861. Charleston, SC: The History Press, 2014. .
 Link, William A. "'This Bastard New Virginia': Slavery, West Virginia Exceptionalism, and the Secession Crisis," West Virginia History, Spring 2009, Vol. 3 Issue 1, pp 37–56
 MacKenzie, Scott A. "The Slaveholders' War: The Secession Crisis in Kanawha County, Western Virginia, 1860–1861," West Virginia History, Spring 2010, Vol. 4 Issue 1, pp 33–57
 McGregor, James C. The Disruption of Virginia. (1922) full text online
 Noe, Kenneth W. "Exterminating Savages: The Union Army and Mountain Guerrillas in Southern West Virginia, 1861–1865." In Noe and Shannon H. Wilson, Civil War in Appalachia (1997), pp 104–30.
 Riccards, Michael P. "Lincoln and the Political Question: The Creation of the State of West Virginia" Presidential Studies Quarterly, Vol. 27, 1997 online edition
 Rice, Otis K. West Virginia: A History (1985)
 Stealey, III, John Edmund. "West Virginia's Constitutional Critique of Virginia: The Revolution of 1861–1863," Civil War History, March 2011, Vol. 57 Issue 1, pp 9–47
 Talbott, F. "Some Legislative and Legal Aspects of the Negro Question in West Virginia during the Civil War and Reconstruction," West Virginia History, Jan 1963, Vol. 24 Issue 2, pp 110–133
 Zimring, David R. "'Secession in Favor of the Constitution': How West Virginia Justified Separate Statehood during the Civil War," West Virginia History, Fall 2009, Vol. 3 Issue 2, pp 23–51

Further reading
 Ambler, Charles H. "The Cleavage between Eastern and Western Virginia". The American Historical Review Vol. 15, No. 4, (July 1910) pp. 762–780 in JSTOR
 Curry, Richard O. "A Reappraisal of Statehood Politics in West Virginia". The Journal of Southern History 28#4 (1962) pp. 403–421. in JSTOR

External links
 Creation of West Virginia in Encyclopedia Virginia
 National Park Service map of Civil War sites in West Virginia
 George Tyler Moore Center for the Study of the Civil War
 West Virginia in the Civil War web site
 

 
American Civil War by state